Lombart Instrument is the largest distributor of ophthalmic instruments based in the  United States. They distribute equipment to eye doctors, teaching institutions, government installations, and hospitals worldwide. Headquartered in Norfolk, Virginia, the company has sales and service branches throughout the United States.

The company was founded in 1979 by Richard and Kenneth Lombart. The company was formed after the two brothers left a career in the contact lens industry which was founded by their father, Adolph Lombart, and built into the world's largest manufacturer of hard contact lenses. That company (Lombart Lenses) was sold to an NYSE company. Lombart Instrument was acquired by Atlantic Street Capital in April 2016.

External links
Official website

Health care companies based in Virginia
Companies based in Norfolk, Virginia